Western Christian College (WCC) was a private Christian college associated with the Churches of Christ located in Regina, Saskatchewan, Canada.  WCC also had a high school program which results in the overall institution being known in many cases as Western Christian College and High School.

WCC was founded in Radville, Saskatchewan.  The school was also located in Weyburn, Saskatchewan and Dauphin, Manitoba before it settled in Regina. It occupied the former premises of the Ambrose University College and Seminary, which moved from Regina to Calgary.

On January 31, 2012, it was announced that Western Christian College's board had voted to cease its operations effective June 30, 2012, after 67 years of operation. The group cited declining enrollments, having only 76 students (of only one were in its collegiate program). The building continued operations as the Orr Centre, which housed its auditorium, offices, and a University of Saskatchewan nursing campus. In 2018, it was proposed that the property be redeveloped as a retail centre. Demolition began in 2019.

References

External links
 Western Christian College, copy archived on July 18, 2012
 History of Western Christian College

Colleges in Saskatchewan
Universities and colleges affiliated with the Churches of Christ
Evangelical seminaries and theological colleges in Canada
Educational institutions established in 1945
Educational institutions disestablished in 2012
Education in Regina, Saskatchewan
1945 establishments in Saskatchewan
2012 disestablishments in Saskatchewan